The 1908 Fordham Maroon football team was an American football team that represented Fordham University as an independent during the 1908 college football season. Fordham claims a 17–3–1 record, and College Football Data Warehouse (CFDW) lists the team's record at 5–1. 

Howard Gargan, who was the captain and quarterback of Fordham's 1907 team, served as the team's head coach. Leo Fitzpatrick was the 1908 team captain.  

The team played its home games at Fordham Field on the school's campus in The Bronx and at the American League Park in the Washington Park neighborhood of Manhattan.

Schedule
The following six games are reported in Fordham's media guide, CFDW, and contemporaneous press coverage.

The following are 13 additional games reported in the Fordham media guide.

References

Fordham
Fordham Rams football seasons
Fordham Maroon football